Krymplings (a pun on Grymlings) are a Swedish supergroup punk band consisting of five lead singers in Swedish punk music which has been active since 1994.

The band consists of Ulke (Strebers, Dia Psalma), Mart Hällgren (De Lyckliga Kompisarna), Per Granberg (Charta 77), Curre Sandgren (Coca Carola) and Mongo (Köttgrottorna).
Everyone wrote the songs, and everyone sang, except for the one who wrote the song, who was not allowed to sing.

Krymplings made a record and a tour (called Dunken tur −94), and then stopped playing. However they made a slight comeback in the summer of 2004 for one concert at the Swedish music festival Augustibuller, and one concert at Kafé 44 in Stockholm.
They released a second album titled 'Första Var Gratis' in 2017 and went on tour that same year.

Discography
 Krymplings (1994). Tracklists:

 Första Var Gratis (2017). Tracklists:

References

External links
Beat Butchers: Krymplings, mini-site from the record company

Swedish punk rock groups